Il futuro è donna (internationally released as The Future Is Woman) is a 1984 Italian drama film directed and written by Marco Ferreri.

The film entered the competition at the 41st Venice International Film Festival.

Plot 
At a crowded nightclub, Malvina, a pregnant girl is harassed and tossed around by a group of thugs. Anna is present, who rescues her from the attack and takes her to her home, where she lives with her partner Gordon. A sexually allusive relationship is then established between the three of them: there is no shortage of sex scenes, but Anna seems to pour into her new friend's impending motherhood the enthusiasm she has not been able to have so far herself, having never had children.

One day, while the three are attending a live concert by Italian singer Pierangelo Bertoli, a group of drifters bursts into the sports hall: clashes ensue in which Gordon loses his life as a result of a hard blow to the head while trying to protect Malvina. After the palasport is evacuated, a shocked Bertoli resumes the concert in front of the now nearly deserted stands, with the trio of protagonists still in place despite the lifeless body of one of them. The unborn child, on the other hand, is safe. Now the two women tighten their relationship even more: they leave the city and stop at a beach, where Malvina's child will be born. After giving birth, the latter departs without a word, leaving the baby in Anna's hands.

Cast 
Ornella Muti as Malvina
Hanna Schygulla as Anna
Niels Arestrup as Gordon
Isabella Biagini as Anna's friend
Maurizio Donadoni as Sergio
Michele Bovenzi as the chief
Laura Morante as Piera
Solveig D'Assunta as Eugenia
Pierangelo Bertoli as himself
Piera Degli Esposti

See also 
 List of Italian films of 1984

References

External links

1984 films
Italian drama films
Films directed by Marco Ferreri
1984 drama films
1980s Italian films